Do Tappeh,, also Romanized as Do Tappeh; also known as Dav-Tappeh, Do Tappeh ,  and Dow Tappeh) is a village in Howmeh Rural District of Do Tappeh District of Khodabandeh County, Zanjan province, Iran. At the 2006 National Census, its population was 3,806 in 823 households, when it was in the Central District. The following census in 2011 counted 4,132 people in 1,150 households. The latest census in 2016 showed a population of 4,094 people in 1,209 households; it was the largest village in its rural district. Howmeh Rural District became a part of Do Tappeh District at its establishment in 2019.

References 

Khodabandeh County

Populated places in Zanjan Province

Populated places in Khodabandeh County